Andrea Bosca (born 14 July 1980) is an Italian actor. He appeared in more than thirty films since 2004.

Life and career 
Andrea Bosca graduated in 2003 from the Teatro Stabile School of Turin, founded by director Luca Ronconi.

In 2004 he became part of the Teatro Stabile of Turin Company. Since 2005, he has also appeared in several Italian and international projects, working in movies, television series and theatrical productions, switching languages and physicality, developing diverse, challenging and realistic characters. He speaks Italian, English, Spanish and French.

He appeared in numerous movies, including Si può fare (We Can Do It) directed by Giulio Manfredonia, Noi credevamo (We Believed) by Mario Martone (Nastro d'Argento 2011), Febbre da fieno (Hay Fever) by Laura Luchetti, Gli sfiorati (Drifters) by Matteo Rovere (for which Bosca won the Guglielmo Biraghi Award in 2012) and Magnifica presenza (Magnificent Presence, also known as A Magnificent Haunting) by Ferzan Özpetek.

He starred in the international TV Series Medici: Master of Florence, and the ABC series Quantico along with actress Priyanka Chopra.

He lately worked in several popular Italian TV series including La porta rossa (The Red Door), Made in Italy (The Series), Romanzo Famigliare by Francesca Archibugi.

He is currently starring in the Amazon Exclusive production 3 Caminos set in the Camino de Santiago (The Way of St. James), available for streaming since January 2021 in more than 20 countries.

He is the writer and the protagonist of the monologue La luna e i falò (The Moon and the Bonfires), an adaptation from the book by Italian author Cesare Pavese, currently on a national tour throughout Italy.

Selected filmography

References

External links 

1980 births
Living people
Italian male film actors
21st-century Italian male actors
People from Canelli